Makouspan is a small suburb along National Road R503 in South Africa, near the border of the larger town of Itsoseng.

See also
Economy of South Africa
History of South Africa

References

Populated places in the Mafikeng Local Municipality